TV's Naughtiest Blunders was an outtakes show, that ran from 19 April 2000 to 28 July 2007 with 39 episodes. It was shown on ITV and produced by Carlton Television (later ITV Productions). The show was narrated by Neil Morrissey (first presented by Steve Penk in the studio) and featured edited out clips and mistakes made by people on TV. The show frequently contained swearing, sexual innuendo and nudity, and because of this it was usually shown late at night. The show sometimes featured deleted out scenes from the news and soaps as well as documentaries and many other TV programmes.

From 2004 to 2007, the show consisted of a voiceover and continuous clips, with commentary from Neil Morrissey who took over from Penk.

Most of the clips shown on the programme were caused by actors forgetting their lines or not being able to stop laughing at what they have to say.

Some shows were titled "All New TV's Naughtiest Blunders", but in the same way of You've Been Framed!, the "All New" tag was featured in the show, or was the title given to the show at the time of broadcast, and had no effect to this date.

External links

2000 British television series debuts
2007 British television series endings
2000s British comedy television series
Blooper shows
Carlton Television
ITV comedy
Television series by ITV Studios
English-language television shows